Tiruchirappalli Palakkarai railway station is a railway station in Palakkarai, Sangiliyandapuram suburb of Tiruchirappalli District in Tamil Nadu.

Jurisdiction
It belongs to the Tiruchirappalli railway division of the Southern Railway zone in Tiruchirappalli district in Tamil Nadu. The station code is TPE.

Lines
This station falls between – broad-gauge section.

References

External links

Trichy railway division
Railway stations in Tiruchirappalli district